Eucalyptus cinerea, commonly known as the Argyle apple, mealy stringbark or silver dollar tree, is a species of small- to medium-sized tree that is endemic to south-eastern Australia. It has rough, fibrous bark on the trunk and branches, usually only juvenile, glaucous, egg-shaped evergreen leaves, flower buds in groups of three, white flowers and conical to bell-shaped fruit.

Description
It has thick, fibrous, reddish brown to grey brown, longitudinally fissured bark on the trunk to the small branches. Flowering occurs between May and November and the flowers are white.

Taxonomy and naming
Eucalyptus cinerea was first formally described by the botanist George Bentham in 1867 from the herbarium of Ferdinand von Mueller, and the description was published in Flora Australiensis. The specific epithet (cinerea) is a Latin word meaning "ash-coloured" or "grey" referring to the white, waxy bloom on the foliage, buds and fruit of this species.

Two subspecies of E. cinerea have been described and the names accepted by the Australian Plant Census:
 Eucalyptus cinerea subsp. cinerea has a crown of mostly juvenile leaves and grows in woodland between Sofala and Tumut in New South Wales;
 Eucalyptus cinerea subsp. triplex has a crown with both juvenile and intermediate leaves; and occurs in the Australian Capital Territory and Captains Flat in New South Wales.

A third subspecies, subspecies victoriensis was described in 2018. It is the tallest subspecies and has adult leaves in its crown.

The Wiradjuri people of New South Wales use the name gundhay for the species.

Distribution and habitat
Argyle apple is typically found from north of Bathurst (33° S), in central west New South Wales, to the Beechworth area of Victoria (36° S). It is often part of grassy or sclerophyll woodland communities growing in  shallow and relatively infertile soils usually as part of the understorey. Subspecies cinerea occurs in the Australian Capital Territory and Captains Flat in New South Wales and subspecies triplex in the Australian Capital Territory and Captains Flat in New South Wales. Subspecies victoriensis is only known from hilly country near Beechworth in Victoria.

Aboriginal uses
The Wiradjuri people of NSW use the bark and timber of the species to make tools, string and rope, shelters and to make fire.

See also
List of Eucalyptus species

References

cinerea
Myrtales of Australia
Trees of Australia
Flora of Victoria (Australia)
Flora of the Australian Capital Territory
Flora of New South Wales
Trees of mild maritime climate
Plants described in 1867
Taxa named by George Bentham